Otto Gerhard Karl Sprengel (27 December 1852, in Waren an der Müritz – 8 January 1915, in Berlin) was a German surgeon.

He studied medicine at the universities of Tübingen, Munich and Rostock, receiving his doctorate at the University of Marburg in 1877. At Marburg he worked as an assistant to surgeon Wilhelm Roser, then afterwards, spent three years as an assistant to Richard von Volkmann at the University of Halle. After practicing medicine for a short period of time in Frankfurt am Main, he was named senior physician at the children's hospital in Dresden (1882). In 1896 he relocated to the hospital in Braunschweig as head of its surgical department. He was elected president of the Deutsche Gesellschaft für Chirurgie, but died soon afterwards of sepsis, contacted when operating on a patient with a gunshot wound.

He was especially interested in abdominal surgery, and introduced a transverse sub-umbilical incision referred to as "Sprengel's incision". In 1891 he described a congenital disorder affecting the scapula that is now known as "Sprengel's deformity". He described the condition in a paper titled Die angeborene Verschiebung des Schulterblattes nach oben ("The congenital upward displacement of the scapula").

His book Appendicitis (1906) was later translated into English. Another noted work by Sprengel was Über den Begriff 'Bruchanlage' in der Praxis (1909).

References 

1852 births
1915 deaths
People from Waren (Müritz)
People from the Grand Duchy of Mecklenburg-Schwerin
German surgeons
19th-century German physicians
University of Marburg alumni
University of Tübingen alumni
University of Rostock alumni
Ludwig Maximilian University of Munich alumni